Live Flesh is a 1997 erotic romantic thriller drama film written and directed by Pedro Almodóvar, based on the 1986 novel of the same name by English author Ruth Rendell. The film stars Javier Bardem, Francesca Neri, Liberto Rabal, Ángela Molina and José Sancho, with Penélope Cruz and Pilar Bardem.

Plot
Madrid, Christmas 1970. The Spanish State has declared a state of emergency curtailing civil liberties. A young prostitute, Isabel Plaza Caballero, gives birth on a bus to a son, Víctor. Twenty years later, Víctor shows up uninvited at the apartment of Elena, a junkie with whom he had sex a week earlier, expecting another date. Elena angrily orders him to leave, eventually threatening him with a gun. Enraged, Víctor wrestles the gun from her; in the process, Elena gets knocked out and the gun goes off.

After a neighbour calls the police, two officers, Sancho and David, arrive on the scene. Sancho is an unstable alcoholic who suspects his wife Clara of infidelity, while David is sensible and righteous. When the officers enter the apartment, Víctor holds Elena hostage at gunpoint. David tries to appease him and get him to drop his gun, but Sancho repeatedly threatens Víctor. Finally, David gets Sancho and then Víctor to put down their guns. David orders Elena to flee. Sancho then lunges for Víctor, and as they wrestle for the gun, David is shot.

Two years later, Víctor, in jail, learns through a televised wheelchair basketball match that David, now partially paralysed from the gunshot, has become a star player at the Summer Paralympics and is married to Elena. Víctor is released four years later, vowing revenge on Elena and David. His mother has died, leaving him some money and a house in an area scheduled for demolition. Víctor visits his mother's grave, where he spots Elena at her father's burial service. Without identifying himself, he briefly offers her his condolences. He then meets Sancho's wife Clara, who has arrived late for Elena's service. They leave together and she visits his apartment. They establish a tentative relationship.

Elena, now clean from drugs and operating an orphanage, tells David of her encounter with Víctor. David stops by Víctor's house and demands that he stay away from Elena. As he leaves, David he sees Clara arriving and watches from a distance. Clara agrees to teach Víctor how to make love and eventually falls in love with him. Víctor is later accepted as a volunteer by the orphanage, as he earned a teaching diploma by correspondence during his time in jail, much to Elena's chagrin.

David continues to trail Víctor and discovers that he works at Elena's orphanage. He confronts Víctor again, and Víctor insists that Sancho forced his finger on the trigger because Sancho knew David was having an affair with Clara. David tells Elena what Víctor said, admitting his affair with Clara. Elena is disgusted, but still plans to leave the orphanage to evade Víctor. Víctor tells Elena that his original plan of revenge was to become the world's greatest lover, make love to Elena all night long, and then abandon her.

Víctor breaks up with Clara, devastating her. While Víctor is working overnight at the orphanage, Elena arrives to retrieve her belongings and offers Víctor a night of passion on condition he never contacts her again. Elena then reveals her infidelity to David. She tells him she will remain his wife because he needs her more than Víctor does. David is nevertheless adamant about exacting revenge on Víctor.

Tired of Sancho's constant abuse, Clara decides to leave him. He confronts her and she shoots him. David arrives and helps Sancho clean his wound before showing him photographs he has been taking of Víctor and Clara. Sancho and David drive to Víctor's house, arriving just as Clara has finished writing Víctor a farewell letter. Sancho and Clara hold each other at gunpoint and fire. Clara falls dead, before a wounded Sancho kills himself.

In a voiceover, David reads a letter written to Elena from Miami, where he is spending Christmas with friends, apologizing for the way everything turned out. At the orphanage, a pregnant Elena goes into labor and on the way to the hospital, she and Víctor get stuck in heavy traffic. Víctor is reminded of the circumstances of his own birth, and tells his unborn child that the Spanish people no longer live in fear as they did at the time of his birth.

Cast

Reception
Almodóvar's twelfth film opened in Spain on 10 October 1997. It had its US premiere on 12 October 1997 at the New York Film Festival. Produced by El Deseo, Ciby 2000 and France 3 Cinéma, Live Flesh enjoyed mostly positive reviews in Spain, even by critics who had previously dismissed Almodóvar's work criticizing the plot structure of his films.

José Arroyo in Sight and Sound praised the film's "emotional pitch: raw, fearful, passionate", its brilliant cinematic qualities and the high standard of acting by the five leads. In Neon magazine, Martin Aston concluded that "sexy movies are rarely this thrilling, thrillers never this sexy—and the two seldom combine so movingly".

On the review aggregator website Rotten Tomatoes, the film holds an approval rating of 80% based on reviews from 44 critics, with an average rating of 7.1/10. The website's reads, "Live Flesh surveys the fallout from an act of violence with a mature melodrama that sees Pedro Almodóvar working in surprisingly restrained form." Metacritic, which uses a weighted average, assigned the film a score of 69 out of 100, based on 18 critics, indicating "generally favorable reviews".

Accolades 

|-
| rowspan = "5" align = "center" | 1998 || rowspan = "3" | 12th Goya Awards || Best Actor || Javier Bardem ||  || rowspan = "3" | 
|-
| Best Supporting Actress || Ángela Molina || 
|-
| Best Supporting Actor || José Sancho || 
|-
| rowspan = "2" | 11th European Film Awards || colspan = "2" | Best Film ||  || rowspan = "2" | 
|-
| Best European Actor || Javier Bardem || 
|-
| align = "center" | 1999 || 52nd British Academy Film Awards || colspan = "2" | Best Film Not in the English Language ||  || 
|}

See also
 List of Spanish films of 1997
 Bas Ek Pal, a Bollywood adaptation of Live Flesh

Notes

References

External links
 
 
 

1997 films
1997 multilingual films
1997 romantic drama films
1997 thriller films
1990s erotic drama films
1990s erotic thriller films
1990s French films
1990s Italian-language films
1990s romantic thriller films
1990s Spanish films
1990s Spanish-language films
1990s thriller drama films
Adultery in films
Ciby 2000 films
El Deseo films
Erotic romance films
Films about paraplegics or quadriplegics
Films based on British novels
Films based on crime novels
Films directed by Pedro Almodóvar
Films featuring a Best Supporting Actor Goya Award-winning performance
Films produced by Agustín Almodóvar
Films scored by Alberto Iglesias
Films set in 1970
Films set in 1990
Films set in 1992
Films set in 1996
Films set in Madrid
Films shot in Madrid
Films with screenplays by Jorge Guerricaechevarría
France 3 Cinéma films
French erotic drama films
French erotic thriller films
French films about revenge
French multilingual films
French romantic drama films
French romantic thriller films
French thriller drama films
Spanish erotic drama films
Spanish erotic thriller films
Spanish films about revenge
Spanish multilingual films
Spanish romantic drama films
Spanish romantic thriller films
Spanish thriller drama films
Spanish-language French films